David John Lewis (27 July 1927 – 19 January 2013) was a Rhodesian first-class cricketer. His career lasted for over 20 years and the second half saw him captain the Rhodesian side which competed in the Currie Cup. He was one of the 1956 South African cricket annual cricketers of the year. He was born at Bulawayo, educated at Plumtree School, the University of Cape Town and Exeter College, Oxford, and died at Johannesburg.

References

1927 births
2013 deaths
Zimbabwean cricketers
Rhodesia cricketers
White Rhodesian people
Zimbabwean expatriates in South Africa
Oxford University cricketers
Oxfordshire cricketers
Alumni of Plumtree School
University of Cape Town alumni
Alumni of Exeter College, Oxford